Stuart Armstrong (born 30 March 1992) is a Scottish professional footballer who plays as a midfielder for  club Southampton and the Scotland national team.

Armstrong began his professional career with Dundee United, making his debut in 2010 and went on to make almost 150 appearances. Armstrong moved to Celtic in February 2015, and helped them win four Scottish league championships and consecutive domestic trebles. He then moved to Premier League club Southampton in June 2018.

Armstrong represented Scotland at under-19 and under-21 level, then made his full international debut in 2017, representing the side at UEFA Euro 2020. He was voted as the SFWA Young Player of the Year in 2013 and has been named in the PFA Scotland Team of the Year for the Scottish Premiership three times. He was also nominated twice for the PFA Scotland Young Player of the Year.

Early life
Born in Inverness, Armstrong attended Hazlehead Academy in Aberdeen, alongside fellow footballer Fraser Fyvie. Armstrong grew up idolizing Gianfranco Zola.

Club career

Early career
Armstrong played for Dyce Boys Club and the Inverness Caledonian Thistle youth team, before signing professionally with Dundee United in July 2009.

Dundee United

2010–11
Armstrong made his first team debut for Dundee United in November 2010, coming on as a substitute in a 1–0 win over Hamilton Academical. Towards the end of the season, manager Peter Houston praised Armstrong on his substitute role.

2011–12
Armstrong then scored his first goal for United in a 2–2 draw against St Mirren in December 2011. After the match, Armstrong said that "I got a deflected goal in Inverness last month but my first proper strike came against St Mirren in the 2-2 draw last week and that has filled me with confidence".

2012–13

After making six appearances this season, Armstrong agreed a three-year contract with Dundee United in September 2012. Armstrong then signed another new contract with United in October 2012. Armstrong scored his first goal of the season on 24 November, in a 2–1 win over Ross County. Having made six appearances in February, Armstrong was awarded Clydesdale Bank Premier League Young Player of the Month. Armstrong was nominated for SPFA young player of the year, but it was awarded to Hibernian's Leigh Griffiths instead. He did, however, go on to win the SFWA Young Player of the Year award.

2013–14
Armstrong and Dundee United began negotiations over a new contract, and on 12 December, he signed a one-year contract extension. Armstrong expressed an ambition to play in England in the future, but said he was happy to wait until he had established himself in the United first team. In the January 2014 transfer window, Celtic were interested in some of Dundee United's other youngsters. This was later dismissed as "speculation" by Celtic manager Neil Lennon. In April 2014, he was nominated for the 2013–14 PFA Scotland Young Player of the Year award. He was also selected to the 2013–14 Premiership PFA Scotland Team of the Year.

2014–15
His last match for Dundee United came in a New Firm derby defeat of Aberdeen in a 2014–15 Scottish League Cup semi-final on 31 January 2015. Armstrong made 150 appearances, starting 109 matches, and scored 22 goals in all competitions for Dundee United before joining Celtic.

Celtic

2014–15
In January 2015, Dundee United turned down two transfer offers from Celtic for Armstrong, however the transfer was completed on 2 February 2015, alongside fellow Dundee United player Gary Mackay-Steven. Armstrong denied requesting the transfer. Both players would be ineligible for the remaining Scottish Cup and Scottish League Cup ties as Celtic chased a domestic treble. Armstrong and Mackay-Steven were later given the nickname Zig and Zag by the staff at Celtic.

Armstrong scored on his Celtic debut in a 3–0 league victory at Partick Thistle on 11 February 2015. He gave Celtic a 2–0 lead after fellow debutante Gary Mackay-Steven opened the scoring. Armstrong made his Celtic Park and European debut in a 3–3 draw with Inter Milan in the UEFA Europa League on 19 February 2015.

2015–16
Armstrong made his first appearance of the 2015–16 season in the UEFA Champions League second qualifying round first leg tie against Stjarnan, assisting the second goal in a 2–0 home win. He scored his first goals of the season with a second-half brace, in a 4–2 league win against Inverness CT on 15 August.

2016–17
Armstrong scored 17 goals in all competitions as Celtic won a domestic treble.

2017–18
Celtic won a second successive domestic treble in 2017–18, but Armstrong's season was interrupted by injuries. In June 2018, Celtic agreed a £7 million transfer fee for Armstrong with Premier League club Southampton.

Southampton

2018–19 
Armstrong signed a four-year contract with Southampton in June 2018. He said he wanted to "hit the ground running" at the club. On 12 August 2018, Armstrong made his debut in a 0–0 draw against Burnley in the Premier League. In November 2018 he stated that he did not miss Scottish football. On 24 November 2018, Armstrong scored his first two goals for Southampton in a 3–2 defeat against Fulham in the league.

2019–20 
On 17 August 2019, Armstrong made his first league appearance of the season in a 1–2 defeat to Liverpool, replacing Ché Adams in the second half. On 2 November 2019, Armstrong made his first league start of the season in a 2–1 defeat to Manchester City. On 11 January 2020, Armstrong scored his first goal of the season in Southampton’s 1–2 victory against Leicester City at the King Power Stadium.

On 13 March 2020, the Premier League was suspended due to the COVID-19 pandemic. This meant that Armstrong and Southampton would not play again until 19 June 2020, where Armstrong scored in a 0–3 victory against Norwich at Carrow Road.

2020–21 
It was announced on 1 January 2021 that Armstrong had signed a new three-and-a-half year contract with Southampton, which will run to the summer of 2024.

International career
Armstrong represented Scotland at under-19 and under-21 levels. On 21 May 2013, Armstrong was called up for the senior team, along with his Dundee United teammate Gary Mackay-Steven. He was called up again by the national team in August 2015, and again in March 2017. Armstrong made his full international debut on 26 March 2017, in a 1–0 win against Slovenia. National team manager Gordon Strachan called it "the best Scotland debut I have ever seen." In September 2017 he was ruled out of two 2018 World Cup qualifying games through injury.

In October 2020 he pulled out of the Scotland squad for a UEFA Euro 2020 qualifying play-off semi-final against Israel after testing positive for COVID-19.

In May 2021 he was selected to the Scotland squad for the delayed UEFA Euro 2020 tournament.

Personal life
In 2014, Armstrong was studying for a law degree through the Open University in his spare time.

Career statistics

Club

International

Scotland score listed first, score column indicates score after each Armstrong goal.

Honours
Celtic
Scottish Premiership: 2014–15, 2015–16, 2016–17, 2017–18
Scottish Cup: 2016–17, 2017–18
Scottish League Cup: 2016–17, 2017–18

Individual
Scottish Premier League Young Player of the Month: February 2013
ArabTRUST's September 2012 Player of the Month award: October 2012
SFWA Young Player of the Year: 2012–13
PFA Scotland Team of the Year (Scottish Premiership): 2013–14, 2014–15, 2016–17

References

External links

Profile at the Southampton F.C. website

1992 births
Living people
Scottish footballers
Footballers from Inverness
Scotland youth international footballers
Scotland under-21 international footballers
Scotland international footballers
Association football midfielders
Inverness Caledonian Thistle F.C. players
Dundee United F.C. players
Celtic F.C. players
Southampton F.C. players
Scottish Premier League players
Scottish Professional Football League players
Premier League players
UEFA Euro 2020 players
People educated at Hazlehead Academy